Villota may refer to:
Francisco Villota (1873–1949), Spanish pelota player
María de Villota (1980–2013), Spanish racing driver

See also
 de Villota